India 2020: A Vision for the New Millennium is a book, written by the 11th President of India A P J Abdul Kalam and Y. S. Rajan. The book was written by the duo in the year 1998, before Kalam's tenure as President. It talks about Kalam's ideas for India's future and for developing India.

Overview 
The book examines in depth the weaknesses and strengths of India, and offers a vision of how India can emerge to be among the world's top four economic powers by the year 2020. The Vision is dedicated to a ten-year-old girl whom Kalam met during one of his talks and asked her about her ambitions, to which the young girl replied, "I want to live in a developed India."

In his book India 2020, Kalam strongly advocates an action plan to develop India into a strong nation by the year 2020. He regards his nation as a knowledge superpower and developed nation. The book describes the present and future scenario in India and developed countries. It compares the various statistical data and explains how India can improve it. Kalam explains the importance of science and technology for the development of India.

In chapter 1 of the book the authors stress the importance of a vision for India, using nations like US, China, Malaysia, and Israel as examples. However, they also point out that this vision should be original, rather than imitating other nations.

In the book, Kalam had also said that it should be the dream of all the citizens to see India as a developed country.

Reception 
According to The Times of India, "Seldom does one, in these troubled times, see such a lucid marshaling of facts and figures to bolster the thesis that India is mere two decades away from super-power status". The Statesman reviewed the book as, "A book of revelation in a plain wrapper".

The book has been translated into multiple languages.

Chapters 
The book has about 344 pages which are divided into 13 chapters.

 Can India Become a Developed Country?yes
 What other countries Envision for Themselves
 Evolution of Technology Vision 2020
 Food, Agriculture and Processing 
Materials and the Future
 Chemicals Industries and Our Biological Wealth400
 Manufacturing for the Future
 Services as People's Wealth 50
 Strategic Industries
 Health Care for All
 The Enabling Infrastructure
 Realizing the Vision
 Response towards India 2020

See also 
 Ignited Minds: Unleashing the Power Within India, a follow-up by Kalam written in 2002
 Target 3 Billion, book about rural development by Kalam and Srijan Pal Singh

References

External links
 
 2020- A Vision for the New Millennium, abdulkalam.nic.in

1998 non-fiction books
Books about India
Books about politics of India
2020 in India
21st century in India
A. P. J. Abdul Kalam
20th-century Indian books
Indian non-fiction books